Vaughn is an unincorporated community in Lower Paxton Township, Dauphin County, Pennsylvania, United States in the Harrisburg-Carlisle Metropolitan Statistical Area, near the census-designated place of Paxtonia. The latitude is 40.322 and the longitude -76.785; the elevation is 541 ft.

External links 

Vaughn, PA profile

Harrisburg–Carlisle metropolitan statistical area
Unincorporated communities in Dauphin County, Pennsylvania
Unincorporated communities in Pennsylvania